was a Japanese politician and Mayor of Hiroshima from 1955-1959.

Was elected to the Lower House of Diet in April 1946, but soon after lost his seat due to the purge of Japanese officials by the US occupation authorities. He was able to return to political activity only following the end of the Allied occupation in 1952.

Mayor of Hiroshima
In April 1955 ran against Shinzo Hamai, and won the election after making allegations of financial misconduct by his opponent. 
As Mayor of Hiroshima, Watanabe was in favor of the exact reconstruction of the Hiroshima Castle, which was completed in 1958.

In 1956, he inaugurated the statue of the goddess Kannon in the Peace Park in memory of those killed and in anticipation of peace. . As mayor of Hiroshima, Watanabe supported the notion of establishing nuclear power plants in his city.

Watanabe is survived by his son Naoyuki Watanabe (born 1946), who is working to cultivate his father's legacy.

External links
 Interview by Watanabe to the Los Angeles Times 
 Article in Time mentioning Watanabe 
 Norioki Ishimaru, Reconstruction planning after the Second World War in Hiroshima

Notes

Japanese politicians
Mayors of Hiroshima
1898 births
1980 deaths